Luis Escobar may refer to:

Luis Escobar Kirkpatrick, 7th Marquess of Marismas del Guadalquivir (1905–1991), Spanish actor and director
Luis Escobar (footballer) (born 1984), Colombian footballer
Luis Escobar (swimmer) (born 1984), Mexican Olympian in 2008
Luis Antonio Escobar (composer) (1925–1993), Colombian composer and musicologist
Luis Antonio Escobar (footballer) (1969–1987), Peruvian footballer
José Luis Escobar Alas (born 1959), Archbishop of El Salvador
Luis Escobar (polo) (born 1971), Costa Rican-American polo player
Luis Munive Escobar (1920–2001), Mexican Roman Catholic bishop
Luis Escobar (baseball) (born 1996), Colombian baseball player